The 2003–04 Arab Champions League is the first edition of a new format called Arab Champions League replacing the former Arab Unified Club Championship. The teams represented Arab nations from Africa and Asia.
CS Sfaxien of Tunisia won the final against El-Ismaily of Egypt.

First round
Qatar and UA Emirates forfeited for undisclosed reasons.
Dahak Club (Djibouti) were originally announced as participants but apparently not included in the draw.

Zone Asia

|}

Zone Africa

|}

Second round

Group A

Group B

Group C

Group D

Group stage

Group 1

Group 2

Al Ahly withdrew after the first match of the group against Al-Hilal, the result of this match was not counted.

Knock-out stage
Knock-out stage held in Beirut, Lebanon.

Semifinals

Third place match

Final

Winners

External links
Arab Champions' League 2003–04 – rsssf.com

Arab Champions League, 2003-04
Arab Champions League, 2003-04
Arab Champions League, 2003-04
Arab Champions League, 2003-04
Arab Club Champions Cup